The 1974 South Carolina gubernatorial election was held on November 5, 1974 to select the governor of the state of South Carolina. Initially considered a longshot candidate, Republican James B. Edwards defeated Democrat W. J. Bryan Dorn with a narrow majority of the vote. 

Edwards' victory made him the first Republican since Daniel Henry Chamberlain in 1874 to win a gubernatorial election in South Carolina. It was also the closest gubernatorial election in South Carolina since the disputed election of 1876.

Democratic primary
Existing term limit restrictions made Governor John C. West ineligible to run for reelection. The South Carolina Democratic Party held their primary for governor on July 16, 1974 . Charles D. Ravenel emerged as the winner of the runoff election, but the South Carolina Supreme Court ruled that Ravenel did not meet the five-year residency requirement in the state's constitution.

U.S. Representative W. J. Bryan Dorn was chosen in a special state convention to be the Democratic candidate in the general election for governor. Dorn, who had supported George McGovern's 1972 presidential campaign, was described by The New York Times as a "political maverick" who took a relatively liberal line on racial and religious issues.

Republican primary
The South Carolina Republican Party held their primary on July 16, 1974 and the contest pitted state senator James B. Edwards against former Army Chief of Staff William Westmoreland. Edwards scored an upset victory in the first Republican primary of the state and earned the right to face Dorn in the general election.

General election
The general election was held on November 5, 1974 and James B. Edwards defeated W.J. Bryan Dorn in what was a banner year for the Democrats in the wake of the Watergate scandal. Turnout was higher than the previous gubernatorial election because of the increasingly competitive nature of the race between the two parties.

 
 
 

|-
| 
| colspan=5 |Republican gain from Democratic
|-

See also
Governor of South Carolina
List of governors of South Carolina
South Carolina gubernatorial elections

References

External links
SCIway Biography of Governor James Burrows Edwards

1974
1974 United States gubernatorial elections
Gubernatorial
November 1974 events in the United States